Quantum Leap is an American science fiction television series, created by Donald P. Bellisario, that premiered on NBC and aired for five seasons, from March 26, 1989, to May 5, 1993. The series stars Scott Bakula as Dr. Sam Beckett, a physicist who involuntarily leaps through spacetime during experiments in time travel, by temporarily taking the place of other people to correct what he consistently discovers were historical mistakes.

Dean Stockwell co-stars as Admiral Al Calavicci, Sam's womanizing, cigar-smoking companion and best friend, who appears to him as a hologram and researches and shapes his opinions of the past.

The series features a mix of humor, drama, romance, social commentary, and science fiction. It was ranked number 19 on TV Guides "Top Cult Shows Ever" in 2007.

A revival series was ordered by NBC, which premiered on September 19, 2022.

Premise and characters

In the near future, physicist Dr. Sam Beckett (Scott Bakula) theorizes that time travel within one's own lifetime is possible, and obtains government support to build his project "Quantum Leap". Some years later, having already spent $43 billion, the government threatens to halt funding, as no progress has been made, and Sam decides to test the project accelerator by himself to save the project before anyone can stop him. He is thrown back in time, and on regaining consciousness, finds that while he physically exists in the past, he appears to everyone else as a person into whom he had "leapt", and further has partial amnesia related to his own identity.

A hologram of his friend Admiral Al Calavicci (Dean Stockwell) appears, visible and audible only to Sam, and helps to explain to Sam that he must correct something that went wrong in the past, aided with the resources of the project's supercomputer Ziggy, the self-aware artificial intelligence "parallel hybrid computer with an ego." Despite successfully correcting the past, Sam continues to leap, seemingly "guided by an unknown force", to another place and time within his own lifetime, "putting right what once went wrong and hoping each time that his next leap will be the leap home".

Sam has six doctoral degrees, a black belt in kung fu, a photographic memory, and near-virtuosic musical talent, allowing him to easily slip into the shoes of many different people. The bookish and naive Sam is a sharp contrast to his best friend Al, a womanizing, cigar-smoking five-time divorcé who grew up in an orphanage, was active in the civil rights movement, and was a prisoner of war in Vietnam.

Sam and Al are the only characters to appear in every episode. The supporting characters of each episode are the friends, family, and acquaintances of the person Sam has leapt into. With a few exceptions such as two-part or sequel episodes, these characters only appear once, though several actors have played multiple characters. Occasionally, Sam will also run into real-life historical figures such as Buddy Holly, Michael Jackson, Donald Trump, Marilyn Monroe, and Ruth Westheimer, the latter of which played herself.

The other members of the Quantum Leap team are mentioned often and each appear in a handful of episodes. They include Irving "Gooshie" Gushman (Dennis Wolfberg), the project's head programmer, Dr. Verbena Beeks (Candy Ann Brown), the project's psychiatrist, Tina Martinez (Gigi Rice), the project's medical technician and Al's lover, and Dr. Donna Eleese (Teri Hatcher/Mimi Kuzyk), Sam's wife and the project's director in his absence.

Production

Development
The main premise for Quantum Leap was inspired by such movies as Here Comes Mr. Jordan (1941) and Heaven Can Wait, as well as the 1960s TV show The Time Tunnel. Series creator Donald P. Bellisario saw its concept as a way of developing an original anthology series, as anthologies were unpopular with the networks.

The series ran on NBC for five seasons, from March 1989 through May 1993.

Soundtrack
The theme for the series was written by Mike Post. It was later rearranged for the fifth season, except for the series-finale episode, which featured the original theme music. Scores for the episodes were composed by Post and Velton Ray Bunch.

A soundtrack album was first released in 1993, titled Music from the Television Series 'Quantum Leap' , dedicated to John Anderson, who played Pat Knight in The Last Gunfighter. It was released by GNP Crescendo on CD and cassette tape.

Episodes

Broadcast history
The Quantum Leap series was initially moved from Friday nights to Wednesdays. It was later moved twice away from Wednesdays to Fridays in late 1990, and to Tuesdays in late 1992. The series finale aired in its Wednesday slot in May 1993.

The most frequent time slot for the series is indicated by italics:
 Sunday at 9:00–11:00 pm on NBC: March 26, 1989
 Friday at 9:00–10:00 pm on NBC: March 31, 1989 – April 21, 1989
 Wednesday at 10:00–11:00 pm on NBC: May 3—17, 1989; September 20, 1989 – May 9, 1990; March 6, 1991 – May 20, 1992
 Friday at 8:00–9:00 pm on NBC: September 28, 1990 – January 4, 1991
 Tuesday at 8:00–9:00 pm on NBC: September 22, 1992 – April 20, 1993
 Wednesday at 9:00–10:00 pm on NBC: May 4, 1993

In the United Kingdom, the show began on BBC Two on February 13, 1990, airing Tuesday evenings at 9:00 pm. The final episode was scheduled to be aired on June 14, 1994, but altered schedules after the death of British dramatist Dennis Potter earlier that month delayed the airing until June 21, 1994. Repeat episodes continued on the channel at various times until December 28, 1999.

Quantum Leap Week 
During the summer of 1990, NBC scheduled a "Quantum Leap Week". Over the course of five consecutive nights, repeat episodes of the show were broadcast in an effort to drum up interest in the fledging series. The "Quantum Leap Week" was repeated during the summer of 1991. Each of the weekly events was supported by a series of advertisements. In each were a series of "man-on-the-street" attempting to say "Quantum Leap Week" fast, with varied levels of success.

Home media
Universal Studios has released the entire, digitally remastered, Quantum Leap series on DVD. Some controversy arose when fans discovered that many songs had been replaced from the soundtrack due to music rights issues. For the fifth season, Universal included all of the original music.

On April 13, 2016, Mill Creek Entertainment announced that it had acquired the rights to the series and re-released the first two seasons on DVD on June 7, 2016.

On February 7, 2017, Mill Creek re-released Quantum Leap - the Complete Series on DVD and also released the complete series on Blu-ray for the first time. The 18-disc set contains all 97 episodes of the series, as well as most of the original music restored for all seasons.

Final episode 
At the end of season five, Bellisario was told to write an episode that could serve as a season finale or series finale, as it was unclear whether Quantum Leap would be renewed. The episode contained some answers to long-standing questions about the show, but contained enough ambiguity for a season six. When the show was not renewed, two title cards were tacked on to the end of the last episode; one read that Al's first wife Beth never remarried, so they were still married in the present day and had four daughters. The last title cards said "Sam Becket [sic] never returned home." The finale was met by viewers with mixed feelings.

A few years after the airing of the finale, a script for an alternate ending was leaked on the internet. It implied that Al, through encouragement of his wife Beth, would become a leaper to go after Sam and that they would be leaping into the future. Bellisario has said no script exists and that he does not know where this idea came from. In 2018, however, fan Allison Pregler purchased title cards taken from season five that contained some shots of Al and Beth together; this implies that part of the alternate ending was, in fact, shot and gives credibility to the alternate-ending scenario. In May 2019, a video of the lost footage was uploaded to Reddit by a contributor with the handle Leaper1953. How this person obtained the footage is not known publicly. Scott Bakula confirmed that several endings were shot and that the footage was authentic.

Reception
The series had a slow start in the ratings, and its timeslot was moved often, but it did well in the 18–49 demographic. The finale was viewed by 13 million American households. In 2004 and 2007, Quantum Leap was ranked number 15 and 19, respectively, on TV Guide "Top Cult Shows Ever".

Awards
Along with 43 nominations, Quantum Leap received 17 awards (listed below).

Other media

Books
Nonfiction
 Barrett, Julie, The A–Z of Quantum Leap. Boxtree Ltd., London 1995. 
 Chunovic, Louis, Quantum Leap Book. Boxtree Ltd., London 1993. 
 Schuster, Hal, The Making of Quantum Leap. HarperCollins, London 1996. 
 Dale, Matt, Beyond the Mirror Image. TME Books, UK 2017. The limited edition first print hardcover was funded via Kickstarter in late 2016 and included both black & white and colored pages. Due to popular demand, the book was reprinted, though the 2nd edition did not include colored pages and came with a book jacket/dust cover. 
Fiction
 Robitaille, Julie, The Beginning. Transworld Publishers|Corgi, London 1990. . Re-published in U.K. by Boxtree Ltd., London 1994. . (Novelization of the pilot episode)
 Robitaille, Julie, The Ghost and the Gumshoe. Corgi, London 1990. . Re-published in U.K. by Boxtree Ltd., London 1994. (Novelization of "Play It Again, Seymour" and "A Portrait of Troian")
 McConnell, Ashley, Quantum Leap: The Novel. Ace Books, 1992. . Re-published in the UK as Carny Knowledge. Boxtree Limited, London 1993. 
 McConnell, Ashley, Too Close for Comfort. Ace Books, 1993. .
 McConnell, Ashley, The Wall. Ace Books, 1994. .
 McConnell, Ashley, Prelude. Ace Books, 1994. .
 Melanie Rawn: Knights of the Morningstar. Ace Books, 1994. .
 Melissa Crandall: Search and Rescue. Ace Books, 1994. .
 McConnell, Ashley, Random Measures. Ace Books, 1995. .
 Storm, L. Elizabeth, Pulitzer. Boulevard, 1995. .
 Henderson, C.J. and Laura Anne Gilman, Double or Nothing. Boulevard, 1995. .
 Walton, Barbara E., Odyssey. Boulevard, 1996. .
 Peel, John, Independence. Boulevard, 1996. . Re-published in the U.K. as Leap into the Unknown. Boxtree Ltd., London 1996 .
 Storm, L. Elizabeth, Angels Unaware. Boulevard, 1997. .
 Davis, Carol, Obsessions. Boulevard, 1997. .
 Schofield, Sandy (Dean Wesley Smith and Kristine Kathryn Rusch), Loch Ness Leap. Boulevard, 1997 .
 Kent, Melanie, Heat Wave. Boulevard, 1997 .
 DeFilippis, Christopher, Foreknowledge. Boulevard, 1998 .
 Peterman, Mindy, Song And Dance. Boulevard, 1998 .
 Davis, Carol, and Esther D. Reese: Mirror's Edge. Boulevard, 2000 .

Comics
Innovation Publishing produced a series of comic books that ran for 13 issues from September 1991 through August 1993. As with the television series, each issue ended with a teaser preview of the following issue and Sam's exclamation of "Oh, boy." Among the people into whom Sam found himself leaping in this series were:

Few of the comic stories referenced episodes of the television series, with the exception of the ninth issue, "Up Against a Stonewall".

Continuation

Proposed films

Television film
In July 2002, the Sci-Fi Channel (which at the time was airing reruns of the show) announced development of a two-hour television film based on Quantum Leap that would have served as a backdoor pilot for a new series, with Bellisario as executive producer.

Feature film
In July 2010 during the TV Guide panel at the San Diego Comic-Con International, Scott Bakula said that Bellisario was working on a script for a projected Quantum Leap feature film. Bellisario confirmed in October 2017 at the L.A. Comic Con that he had finished the script.

Revival

In January 2020, Jeff Bader, NBC's head of program planning and strategy, announced that the network was considering a reboot of Quantum Leap for the launch of its Peacock streaming service.

In January 2022, NBC greenlit a pilot episode of a Quantum Leap sixth season revival. Bellisario is involved, while the showrunners include Steven Lilien and Bryan Wynbrandt, with Deborah Pratt and Martin Gero as executive producers. The pilot will take place 30 years after the conclusion of the original series, with a new team reviving Project Quantum Leap to understand both it and the fate of Sam Beckett. Raymond Lee was signed to star in the pilot in the role of Dr. Ben Song, the person that ends up traveling back in time through the Quantum Leap project. Ernie Hudson was cast as Herbert "Magic" Williams, the lead of the new Quantum Leap program and a Vietnam War veteran whom Sam leaped into in the season three episode "The Leap Home (Part 2) – Vietnam". NBC gave the green light for a full season order in May 2022. In July 2022, it was announced that Dean Georgaris joined as showrunner. It premiered on September 19, 2022, airing on Monday nights.

In September 2022, original series star Scott Bakula confirmed that he had been asked by producers to reprise his role as Sam Beckett in the revival, but ultimately decided to not be involved with the new series, saying in a statement on Instagram, "As the show has always been near and dear to my heart, it was a very difficult decision to pass on the project".

In popular culture 
In the 2019 film Avengers: Endgame, Scott Lang brings the show up as one of many examples of time travel in fiction allowing you to change your own past, contrasting Bruce Banner's explanation that time travel works differently in their universe.

Source Code, a 2011 science-fiction action thriller film, was directed by Duncan Jones. Jones said in reading its script that he was reminded of Quantum Leap and as a reference to the show, cast Bakula in a voice cameo role, including giving him one line of "Oh, boy" in the script.

Special episodes of Star Trek: Enterprise ("Detained", 2002) and NCIS: New Orleans ("Chasing Ghosts", 2014), both series that featured Bakula as lead, included Stockwell as a guest star to reunite the two actors from Quantum Leap. Further, "Chasing Ghosts" was directed by James Whitmore Jr., who had directed 15 episodes, and acted in three episodes, of Quantum Leap.

The 2017 episode "The Gang Turns Black" of the series It's Always Sunny in Philadelphia features numerous Quantum Leap references. When the gang finds themselves in different bodies, Sweet Dee suggests that they are "quantum leaping". Bakula has a guest appearance, as himself, researching an upcoming role.

References

External links
 
 
 
 Archive of Syfy Quantum Leap official site with Bakula and Stockwell interviews.

 
1989 American television series debuts
1980s American drama television series
1980s American science fiction television series
1980s American time travel television series
1993 American television series endings
1990s American drama television series
1990s American science fiction television series
1990s American time travel television series
Alternate history television series
Edgar Award-winning works
Emmy Award-winning programs
English-language television shows
Fiction about body swapping
Holography in television
Innovation Publishing titles
NBC original programming
Television series about being lost from home
Television series by Universal Television
Television series created by Donald P. Bellisario
Television shows set in New Mexico
Television shows set in the United States